Peter Sturrock (1820 – 7 March 1904) was a Scottish civil engineer, colliery owner and provost of Kilmarnock and a Conservative politician.

Sturrock was the son of David Sturrock, of Struthers, near Kilmarnock and his wife Helen Woodbum. He was educated at Kilmarnock Academy and at Glasgow.  Sturrock married Helen Hutchinson Guthrie in 1850. He was a civil engineer, a colliery owner, and a director of North British Canadian Investment Co., and Scottish Ontario Land Co. He was provost of Kilmarnock and a justice of the peace for Ayrshire He was one of the founders and president of the Kilmarnock Burns Club.

He was elected at the 1885 general election as the Member of Parliament (MP) for Kilmarnock Burghs, with a majority of only 132 votes, but was defeated at 1886 general election.

Sturrock purchased Baltesan Castle with the intention of restoring it, but the plans never came to fruition.

Sturrock died at the age of 83.

References

External links 

1820 births
1904 deaths
Scottish Tory MPs (pre-1912)
Members of the Parliament of the United Kingdom for Scottish constituencies
UK MPs 1885–1886
Scottish civil engineers
Provosts in Scotland
People from Kilmarnock
People educated at Kilmarnock Academy
19th-century Scottish businesspeople